Showmars is a Charlotte, North Carolina-based restaurant chain, serving a mix of American and Greek cuisines. It was founded by George Couchell (pronounced "coo-shell") in 1982. As of June 2006, Showmars operates 25 locations and employs about 1,000 employees.

Company history

Founding
In 1982, first generation Greek immigrant George Couchell (who graduated from Duke University and was a Naval Officer) opened his first Showmars restaurant in Monroe, North Carolina.
Besides Charlotte locations, it also covers Fort Mill, Gastonia, Huntersville, Concord, Mooresville, Monroe, Rock Hill, and Matthews.
According to the Charlotte Observer, the partners' goal is to open three restaurants a year in The Carolinas. Showmars has recently opened locations in Shelby and Denver.

See also
 List of Greek restaurants

References

External links
 

Restaurants in North Carolina
Regional restaurant chains in the United States
Greek restaurants in the United States
Companies based in Charlotte, North Carolina
Restaurants established in 1982
1982 establishments in North Carolina